Nathan Hale High School is a public high school in West Allis, Wisconsin, located on Lincoln Avenue and South 116th Street. The school boundaries are the City of West Allis, Village of West Milwaukee as well as portions of New Berlin and Greenfield. It runs on a 50-minute, 7 period, 2 semester schedule. The faculty is made of more than 100 faculty members including 5 guidance counselors and 6 administrators. Nathan Hale High School offers organizations including Nathan Hale Mentors, FBLA, HOSA, and DECA as well as clubs, such as Students for Saving the Earth, Key Club, DART, Bowling Club, Forensics, National Honor Society, German, French and Spanish Honors Societies, Drama Club, Magic the Gathering Club, Video Game Club, and more. Nathan Hale's rival is the West Allis Central Bulldogs.

History 
Nathan Hale High School was initially established in 1931 as an additional junior high school, requested in response to an ever-growing population of students. The first building for Hale still stands, as it is the current building for West Allis Central. Nathan Hale Junior High School was a title short lived, as the current name for the school was conceived in 1941, serving both junior and senior high schoolers alike until 1957. The school served those students at this location until 1968, when the current building was opened two miles to the west, prompting Central to move into Hale's original building in 1973. Central's first building was torn down and subsequently replaced with the current West Allis Public Library.

The current building for Nathan Hale has retained its stark, brutalist architecture of the 1960's, but not without renovations. In 1999, the cafeteria moved downstairs into its current location in the northeastern corner of the building. Traces of the old cafeteria are encased in the walls of the Mentoring Program homeroom, where water fountains are present. In the same year, an additional auxiliary gym was also constructed. In 2005, the school's current weight room was finished.

Athletics
Despite Nathan Hale's direct rival being the Central Bulldogs, the two schools are not in the same athletic conference; Hale is apart of the Greater Metro Conference, while Central is apart of the Woodland Conference. 

Boys sports include:
 Football
 Baseball
 Basketball
 Soccer
 Volleyball
 Wrestling
 Bowling
 Swimming and Diving
 Tennis
 Track and Field
 Golf
 Cross Country

Girls sports are:
 Basketball
 Softball
 Soccer
 Track and Field
 Tennis
 Cross Country
 Volleyball
 Gymnastics
 Swimming and Diving

Championships
Hale won a WIAA state championship in boys cross country in 1968.

The Girls Varsity Basketball Team won a Conference Championship in 2018. 

The Boys Varsity Basketball Team won Conference Championships in 1989, 1991 and 1992. 

The Varsity Football Team won a Conference Championship going undefeated for the season, and was the #1 ranked team in the State in 1952.

Notable alumni
Marisabel Cabrera, member of the Wisconsin State Assembly.
Tony Staskunas, lawyer and politician
Rick Wagner, former NFL offensive tackle
Chris Scheels, Olympic speed skater

References

Public high schools in Wisconsin
Schools in Milwaukee County, Wisconsin
Greater Metro Conference